Eurotica is a genus of jumping plant lice in the subfamily Aphalarinae and tribe Xenaphalarini, erected by Loginova in 1962.

Species 
GBIF includes:

References

Hemiptera genera
Taxa described in 1962
Aphalaridae